Tarlok Nath Shorey is an Indian mathematician who specialises in theory of numbers. He is currently a distinguished professor in the department of mathematics at IIT Bombay. Previously, he worked at TIFR.

He was awarded in 1987 the Shanti Swarup Bhatnagar Prize for Science and Technology, the highest science award in India, in the mathematical sciences category. Shorey has done significant work on transcendental number theory, in particular best estimates for linear forms in logarithms of algebraic numbers.
He has obtained some new applications of Baker’s method to Diophantine equations and Ramanujan’s T-function.
Shorey's contribution to irreducibility of Laguerre polynomials is extensive.

Selected publications
T. N. Shorey, On gaps between numbers with a large prime factor, II Acta Arith. 25(1973/74).
T. N. Shorey and R. Tijdeman, On the greatest prime factor of an arithmetical progression, A tribute to Paul Erdős, Cambridge Univ. Press, Cambridge, 1990.
T. N. Shorey and R. Tijdeman, On the greatest prime factor of an arithmetical progression. II, Acta Arith. 53 (1990).
T. N. Shorey and R. Tijdeman, On the greatest prime factors of an arithmetical progression. III, Approximations diophantiennes et nombres transcendents (Luminy, 1990), 275{280, de Gruyter, Berlin, 1992.
T. N. Shorey and R. Tijdeman, Exponential Diophantine Equations, Cambridge Univ. Press, Cambridge, 1986.

References

External links
Indian National Science Academy database

1945 births
Living people
Indian number theorists
20th-century Indian mathematicians
Recipients of the Shanti Swarup Bhatnagar Award in Mathematical Science